Higelin is a surname. Notable people with the surname include:

Alphonse Higelin (1897–1981), French gymnast and Olympian
Arthur Higelin (born 1966), better known Arthur H, French songwriter, singer and pianist
Izïa Higelin (born 1990), more commonly known as Izïa, French rock singer and guitarist
Jacques Higelin (1940–2018), French singer
Kên Higelin (born 1972), French stage and film actor, theatre director and music video director